The Turkey national youth football team are the national under-20, under-19, under-18, under-17, under-16, under-15 and under-14 football teams of Turkey and are controlled by the Turkish Football Federation. The youth teams of Turkey participate in tournaments sanctioned by both UEFA and FIFA and also participates in world, regional, and local international tournaments.

Turkey national under-20 squad

The following players have been called up for a tournament between 15 and 23 of August 2012.

*Some of these players play for their club's reserve team.

Turkey national under-19 squad

The following players have been called up to participate in the 2012 UEFA European Under-19 Football Championship elite qualification in May 2012.

*Some of these players play for their club's reserve team.

|-

|-

|-

Turkey national under-17 squad

The following players have been called up to participate in the Muntenia Trophy Cup between 6 and 10 of August 2012.

*These players are currently playing in the youth academies of their respective clubs.

Past achievements
 Winner of UEFA European Under-17 Football Championship: 1994 & 2005
 4th Place in FIFA U-17 World Cup: 2005
 Semi-finalist of UEFA European Under-17 Football Championship: 2008 & 2010

See also
 Turkey national football team
Turkey national under-21 football team
 Turkey national under-20 football team
 Turkey national under-19 football team
 Turkey national under-17 football team
 Turkey national youth football team

References

youth
Youth football in Turkey